Bahati Bukuku is a Tanzanian gospel singer, vocalist and actress known for gospel hits songs like Dunia Haina Huruma, Songa Mbele, maamuzi Yako, Abneri, wewe ni Mungu, umewazidi wote  and many more. Bahati Bukuku have also acted in some bongo movies with gospel contents together with the Singer Jennifer Mgendi  including "Teke la mama" and"nipo studio"

Bahati Bukuku was born in October 1981 in Rungwe District, Mbeya Region and Raised in Mbeya Region. She studied at Muungano Primary school and Meta Secondary school.

Bahati Bukuku after she graduated secondary school moved to Dar es Salaam so that she can Reseat her secondary examination  and that when she started to sing and subsequently she recorded her first album "Yashinde mapito" which made her known all over the country

References

Tanzanian gospel singers
Tanzanian actresses
1981 births
Living people